Ab Namard (also Romanized as Āb Namard) is a village in Nazil Rural District, Nukabad District, Khash County, Sistan and Baluchestan Province, Iran. At the 2006 census, its population was 39, in 6 families.

References 

Populated places in Khash County